DP&L Inc. is a subsidiary of AES Corporation. Through its subsidiaries The Dayton Power and Light Company and DPL Energy Resources, DP&L sells to, and generates electricity for, a customer base of over 500,000 people within a  area of West Central Ohio, including the area around Dayton, Ohio, its namesake. Electricity for DP&L's 24 county service area within Ohio's Miami Valley is primarily generated at eight coal-fired power plants, but DP&L also provides service to its clients via the use of combustion turbines, diesel peaking units, and solar powered properties.

History
The Dayton Power and Light Company was incorporated in 1911 under the laws of Ohio.  DP&L is the principal subsidiary of DPL providing approximately 99% of DPL's total consolidated revenue and approximately 92% of DPL's total consolidated asset base.  DPL and its subsidiaries employed over 1,500 people as of January 31, 2008.  Prior to 2000, DP&L also distributed natural gas within its service area; its gas operations were divested in the Fall of 2000 to Vectren, an Evansville, Indiana-based company that formed earlier that year. DPL was acquired by AES in 2011. The transaction was valued at $4.7 billion and it enabled AES to acquire all of the outstanding shares of DPL for $3.5 billion in cash, or $30 per share.

In 2018, DP&L, aiming at a restructure of the company, announced that 160 jobs (60 in Ohio and 100 in Indiana) would be cut in the second quarter of the fiscal year. DP&L would also shut down two coal plants it operated in Southern Ohio, J.M. Stuart and Killen. Later that year, DP&L announced it would invest up to $1 million in investments to support the installation of electric vehicle charging stations within its coverage territory in Ohio.

Operations within Puerto Rico
Following the aftermath of Hurricane Maria in 2017, DP&L began taking an active role in America's recovery efforts; working alongside AES to renovate the central power grid that was damaged by the storm.

Currently, AES and DP&L have provided Puerto Rico with 6 megawatts of battery based storage units, provided by its Tait Energy Storage Station, in order to expedite the recovery process. Additionally, DP&L would also play a role in AES’ proposed construction of a series of autonomous “micro-grids”. The goal of said micro-grids would be to provide reserve power to small public locations, such as schools and hospitals. These grids, if greenlit, would be equipped with solar panels and powered by batteries, thereby alleviating the island's dependency on imported fossil fuels.

References

External links
DPL, Inc. (company website)
Dayton Power and Light

Companies based in Dayton, Ohio
Electric power companies of the United States
AES Corporation
2011 mergers and acquisitions